Club de Fútbol Sóller (in English, Sóller Football Club) is a Spanish football team based in Sóller, Majorca, in the autonomous community of the Balearic Islands. Founded on 1954, it currently plays in Tercera División RFEF - Group 11, holding home matches at the Camp d'en Maiol, with a capacity of 1,500 people.

History
Founded in 1954, CF Sóller played in regional categories since his foundation. The best seasons were the 80's and 90's, when the club reached Tercera División.

In 1997, the club reached the Segunda División B, but was immediately relegated to the fourth division and subsequently suffered an administrative relegation to the Primera Regional Preferente. The club returned to the fourth tier in 2000, being relegated back in 2002 but achieving immediate promotion.

From 2007 to 2012, Sóller played in the Preferente again until 2012, when they promoted to the fourth tier. Relegated back in 2013, the club played three consecutive seasons in Tercera before again suffering relegation. They returned to the fourth division in 2018.

Club's background
Marià Sportiu – (1923–26)
Sóller Foot-Ball – (1926–35)
CD Sóller – (1935–49)
UD Atlético de Sóller – (1949–51)
Águilas Sóller – (1952–54)

Season to season

1 season in Segunda División B
32 seasons in Tercera División
1 season in Tercera División RFEF
36 seasons in Categorías Regionales

Current squad

Technical staff
 Head coach:  Álex López Boule
 Assistant coach:  Daniel García
 Fitness coach:  Jaume Segura
 Physiotherapist:  Lluís Bernat

Honours
 Tercera División: 1995–96
 Categorías Regionales: 1962–63, 1970–71, 1983–84, 1999–2000, 2002–03, 2011–12, 2013–14, 2017–18
 Baleares Championship: 1946–47
 Copa Uruguay: 1961

Famous players
 Ángel Pedraza

Stadium
Sóller hold home games at Camp d'en Maiol, with a 1,500-spectators capacity. It opened on 24 August 1923. 500 seats are located on a covered tribune, and the pitch's dimensions are 98×61 metres.

References

External links
 FFIB team profile  

Football clubs in the Balearic Islands
Sport in Mallorca
Association football clubs established in 1954
Sóller
1954 establishments in Spain